Šimunović is a South Slavic surname, a patronymic of Šimun. Notable people with the surname include:

 Dinko Šimunović (1873–1933), Croatian writer
 Jozo Šimunović (born 1994), Bosnian-Croatian footballer
 Luka Šimunović (born 1997), Croatian footballer
 Mario Simunovic (born 1989), Swedish footballer of Croatian descent
 Mato Šimunović (born 1985), Austrian footballer of Bosnian origin
 Petar Šimunović (1933–2014), Croatian linguist
 Pjer Šimunović, (born 1962), Croatian diplomat
 Renato Šimunović (born 1994), German rapper of Bosnian Croat descent

See also
 Simunović
 Šimonović

Bosnian surnames
Croatian surnames
Serbian surnames
Slavic-language surnames
Patronymic surnames
Surnames from given names